Kuch Kuch Hota Hai  also known as KKHH or K2H2, is a 1998 Indian Hindi-language musical romance film written and directed by Karan Johar and produced under Dharma Productions. It stars the popular on-screen pair of Shah Rukh Khan and Kajol in lead roles, along with Rani Mukerji and Salman Khan. It also features Sana Saeed in a supporting role. The plot combines two love triangles set years apart. The first half covers friends on a college campus, while the second tells the story of a widower's young daughter who tries to reunite her dad with his old best friend.

Filmed in India, Mauritius and Scotland, this was Johar's directorial debut. One of his goals for the film was to set a new level for style in Hindi cinema. The music was composed by Jatin–Lalit, which was the biggest seller of the year. Kuch Kuch Hota Hai was released on 16 October 1998, in India and United Kingdom and received positive reviews from critics who praised the setting, music, direction, cinematography, screenplay, performances and overall presentation. The film was successful in India and abroad, becoming the highest-grossing Indian film of the year and the third highest-grossing Indian film at that time. Outside India, the film was the highest-grossing Hindi film ever until its record was broken by Karan Johar's next directorial, Kabhi Khushi Kabhie Gham... (2001).

The film received various accolades, including the National Film Award for Best Popular Film Providing Wholesome Entertainment and Best Film at the Filmfare Awards, Screen Awards, Zee Cine Awards and Bollywood Movie Awards. Kuch Kuch Hota Hai won 8 Filmfare Awards and was the only film to win all four acting awards (Best Actor, Best Actress, Best Supporting Actor, and Best Supporting Actress) until Gully Boy (2019).

Plot 

Rahul Khanna and Anjali Sharma are best friends in college who frequently spend time together and play basketball. Anjali Sharma, a tomboy, is much better at the game than Rahul who wins occasionally by cheating. Their friendship is tested by the arrival of Tina Malhotra, the attractive daughter of college principal Ravikant Malhotra who has come from London. Rahul is immediately smitten and starts hazing her as a means to grab attention. The two grow attracted to each other, leading Anjali Sharma to feel jealous and lonely. She realizes she is in love with Rahul and cannot stand seeing him get closer to Tina. Matters get worse, when Rahul admits to Anjali that he loves Tina, on the day Anjali decides to confess her love for Rahul, leaving her heartbroken. She changes colleges, leaves town, and breaks off all ties with Rahul. After college, Rahul marries Tina and they are blessed with a daughter who is also named Anjali. Unfortunately, Tina dies due to the delivery complications but not before writing eight letters for Anjali Khanna to read on her subsequent birthdays. 

Eight years later, widower Rahul is shown as a single parent to his 8-year-old daughter Anjali Khanna. On her birthday, Tina's eighth letter introduces Anjali Khanna to Rahul's college friend by the same name. In the letter, Tina asks Anjali Khanna to reunite Rahul with Anjali Sharma, having always been aware of her feelings for Rahul. At a camp for children in Shimla, Anjali Sharma is a facilitator who teaches music and dance. Against Rahul, Anjali Khanna enrolls in the camp and goes to Shimla along with Rahul's mother Savita Khanna. Over there, she meets her namesake for the first time and tricks Rahul into visiting the camp, reuniting him with Anjali Sharma after many years. Using her mother's descriptions of their college days in the letter, Anjali Khanna recreates familiar situations that enable Rahul and Anjali Sharma to rekindle their friendship. They eventually find love again with each other, but this time, are interrupted by the arrival of Anjali Sharma's fiancé Aman Mehra. Finally snapping back to reality, Anjali Sharma leaves the camp midway to return home and marry Aman.

On the day of the wedding, Anjali Khanna lets Aman know of her mother's letter and her quest to unite Rahul with Anjali Sharma. Meanwhile, Rahul stumbles into Anjali Sharma at an upstairs balcony and finally expresses his love for her. At the wedding hall downstairs, Aman and the guests are awaiting Anjali Sharma to make her way to the wedding alter for the final ritual. She walks down the stairs but stops after seeing Rahul. Aman, realizing that Anjali Sharma will always be in love with Rahul, calls off their engagement. He asks Rahul to marry her in his stead, joining in the celebration. Rahul and Anjali Sharma are finally united and Anjali Khanna is beset with emotion at having fulfilled Tina's last wish expressed in her letter.

Cast 

 Shah Rukh Khan as Rahul Khanna
 Kajol as Anjali Sharma
 Rani Mukerji as Tina Malhotra
 Sana Saeed as Anjali Khanna
 Farida Jalal as Savita Devi
 Anupam Kher as Ravikant Malhotra
 Reema Lagoo as Ramnika Sharma
 Archana Puran Singh as Ms. Braganza
 Himani Shivpuri as Rifat Qazi
 Johnny Lever as Colonel Almeida
 Parzan Dastur as Jasdeep Singh
 Salman Khan as Aman Mehra (special appearance)
 Neelam Kothari as Neelam Sharma (special appearance)
 Nikkhil Advani in Neelam's talk show segment (special appearance)
 Manish Malhotra as a college student sitting on the steps of college when Anjali Sharma wears feminine clothing (special appearance)
 Farah Khan in Neelam's talk show and sitting on the steps of college when Anjali wears feminine clothing (special appearance)
 Geeta Kapoor in the song "Tujhe Yaad Na Meri Aayee" (special appearance)
 Hiroo Johar as Professor Madhavi Goenka, walking down the steps of college when Anjali wears feminine clothing (special appearance)

Production

Story
After the experience of assisting and acting in Aditya Chopra's directorial debut, the romantic drama Dilwale Dulhania Le Jayenge (1995), Karan Johar was encouraged to try his own hand at directing. With Kuch Kuch Hota Hai, he chose to pair up the same lead actors, Shah Rukh Khan and Kajol, for his own romance film. During the filming of Dilwale Dulhania Le Jayenge, Khan had also encouraged Johar to make his own film, and said that he would be willing to star in it. They were signed by producer and his father Yash Johar in early 1997. Yash Johar officially announced the film in October 1997 at Mehboob Studios in Bandra.

Johar first wrote a story, which was a love triangle between a tomboy, a very pretty girl, and a slightly insensitive boy, but he shelved the idea because he was not very satisfied with it. Then he wrote another plot about a widower and his child, which he shelved as well. Eventually, he decided to merge the two stories into one. He explained in an interview with Rediff.com: "It was about the trauma of a widower and his little child. How the child really wants a mother and how she brings her mother into her father's life. Then I thought: Why not bring a youth aspect to the story? Why not a flashback? That's how the story got made." The story also includes a "personal desires vs. parental loyalties" theme and has some "East meets West" themes, but instead of the characters going abroad, it creates a virtual West inside India.

Development
Karan Johar was certain from the beginning that he wanted to cast Shah Rukh Khan in the lead role, having observed him during the making of Dilwale Dulhania Le Jayenge. It took longer to fill the role of Tina. The role was written with Twinkle Khanna in mind, but she turned it down. Other actresses such as Urmila Matondkar, Tabu, Shilpa Shetty, Aishwarya Rai, Raveena Tandon and Karisma Kapoor were offered the role but also turned it down. Aditya Chopra and Shah Rukh Khan noticed Rani Mukerji's acting in Raja Ki Aayegi Baraat (1996), and suggested her to Karan Johar. He thus signed her, giving a boost to her career. Saif Ali Khan and Chandrachur Singh were initially offered the role of Aman, but they both turned it down, thus prompting Johar to rope in Salman Khan.

Johar, who is also a costume designer, wanted to set a new level for style in Hindi cinema with this film. He and his friend Manish Malhotra, the film's costume designer, made trips to London for costumes, much to the chagrin of his father and producer Yash Johar, who was concerned about the budget. Many of the costumes in the film prominently displayed logos from designers such as DKNY and Polo. In addition to the designer fashions, Johar also created a somewhat fantastical world where the students speak Hinglish and enjoy a pristine college campus, where there is no crime or hate, and traditional Hindu values are pervasive. Johar admitted that the look and feel of the college scenes in the film were patterned after Beverly Hills 90210, saying, "The art, the costumes, tilt toward the West, but the soul of the film is Indian." He hired Sharmishta Roy as art director, and told her to produce something similar to Riverdale High School of the Archie Comics, with some 90210 influence as well. Johar said of the outcome, "If you see KKHH, Shahrukh plays Archie, Rani Mukherji plays Veronica, and Kajol played Betty. It was exactly that. And the principal looked like Weatherbee, and Ms. Grundy was Archana Puran Singh." Johar also hired Farah Khan to do the choreography, Jatin–Lalit to provide the music, Santosh Thundiyil as cinematographer, and Nikhil Advani as his associate director. Shabina Khan assisted Manish Malhotra with costume design.

Filming
Filming began on 21 August 1997. The crew was young and inexperienced to the point where Shah Rukh Khan had to explain basic technicalities of filming. Khan later said, "Karan makes no bones of the fact that his technical knowledge of filmmaking was not at its peak when he made the biggest hit of the decade." The entire film was shot in nine and half months with a substantial part of it shot in Mauritius. The title song was filmed over a ten-day period. in several picturesque locations in Scotland, including Eilean Donan, Glen Coe, Loch Lomond and Tantallon Castle with the nearby Bass Rock as a backdrop in one scene. The scenes from the summer camp in Shimla were filmed at Wenlock Downs in Ooty, Tamil Nadu.

During the bicycle sequence in the song "Yeh Ladka Hai Deewana", Kajol lost control of her bike, fell flat on her face, and was knocked unconscious while also injuring her knee. During the promotional Making of Kuch Kuch Hota Hai TV special, Kajol stated that the accident was her most memorable part of shooting the film because she doesn't remember it. During preparation for the reunion scene where the two leads met after more than 8 years apart, the director told them to improvise and rehearse the reactions that they might use, but he secretly taped them and was so happy with the result that it was put into the film.

Soundtrack
The soundtrack for Kuch Kuch Hota Hai was composed by Jatin–Lalit and the lyrics were penned by Sameer. This is the first collaboration of the duo with Karan Johar. It was released by the Sony Music label on 12 August 1998. While the film was still untitled, Javed Akhtar was signed to write the lyrics, and even wrote and recorded one song(koi mil gaya). However, when the movie was titled Kuch Kuch Hota Hai, he found the title mediocre, obscene, and vulgar and decided to quit the project. Akhtar later regretted leaving the film, as he found it decent and could see that the title has become quite a buzzword, realizing that he was the only one who disliked the title.

The album became the best-selling Bollywood soundtrack of the year, with  units sold in India. The title song remained on the Indian music charts for over a year, and the album peaked at number #2 on the Malaysian albums chart (RIM) in 1999. Sony Music Indonesia also sold 300,000 copies in Indonesia, for a combined  copies sold in India and Indonesia.

Mukul Deshpande of Planet Bollywood rated the soundtrack 8.5 out of 10 stars, although he did not like all of the songs. In 2012, it was voted as the most popular film song of the previous decade by NDTV.  The full soundtrack came in second place in a similar poll conducted by the BBC, the first place being taken by Dilwale Dulhania Le Jayenge, an album which was also composed by Jatin–Lalit.

On 2002, Sony Music India also released Kuch Kuch Hota Hai in Telugu version.

Reception

Critical reception
While comparing the film to Dil To Pagal Hai (1997), Nikhat Kazmi of The Times of India gave Kuch Kuch Hota Hai 3.5 out of 5 stars. She especially liked the performance of Kajol, and thought that the film would appeal to young and romantic viewers primarily for its "MTV ambience" and "Valentine's Day flavours". On the negative side, she said "The second half, however, gets drowned in a sea of emotions. Too many people begin to cry a bit too much." Anish Khanna of Planet Bollywood rated the film 9.5 out of 10 stars, calling it "pure escapist cinema at its best." He praised the cinematography, choreography, set decoration, and also raved over Kajol's performance, along with her onscreen chemistry with Shah Rukh Khan. Overall, he said, "Karan Johar makes an impressive directorial debut, has a good script sense, and knows how to make a film with S-T-Y-L-E." In contrast to these views, the reaction of Sujata C J, writing for Rediff.com, was that the film was very disappointing, with many cliches and a bad storyline, though Santosh Thundiyil and Sharmishta Roy were praised for their camerawork and art direction, respectively. Nandita Chowdhury in a review for India Today, said that Karan Johar was almost able to rekindle the Khan-Kajol magic of Dilwale Dulhania Le Jayenge, and that overall the film was "a good distraction".

In January 2023, IndieWire ranked Kuch Kuch Hota Hai as the world's best romantic comedy (rom-com) on Netflix, above Scott Pilgrim vs. the World (2010) at number two and Notting Hill (1999) at number three. IndieWire writers Kate Erbland and Alison Foreman called Kuch Kuch Hota Hai "a love triangle for the ages" and said it is "a bittersweet and bubbly story of young love, missed opportunity, and female friendship" with "what’s quite possibly the most romantic gazebo scene of all time."

Box office
There were great expectations for Kuch Kuch Hota Hai leading up to its premiere, because it re-united the Dilwale Dulhania Le Jayenge team of Shah Rukh Khan and Kajol, and specifically concerning the debut of Karan Johar, whether he would be in the same league as Aditya Chopra as a first-time writer/director.

It became the third film to gross over  worldwide in the 1990s, after Hum Aapke Hain Koun..! (1994) and Dilwale Dulhania Le Jayenge. It is the highest-grossing Bollywood film of 1998 worldwide. It also became the third highest-grossing Indian film then, behind Hum Aapke Hain Koun..! and Dilwale Dulhania Le Jayenge.

India
It opened on Friday, 16 October 1998, across 240 screens, along with Bade Miyan Chote Miyan, and earned  nett on its opening day. It grossed  nett in its opening weekend, and went on to record the second-highest first week of the year with collections around  nett, after Bade Miyan Chote Miyan which grossed  nett. It is the highest-grossing film of 1998 in India.

Overseas
It had an opening weekend of $800,000 (3.38 crore) and went on to gross $1.3 million (5.49 crore) in its first week. It became the first film to cross $5 million mark outside India, and became the highest grosser at that time. According to Box Office India, the film earned a total of $6.3 million (26.61 crore) overseas. According to the book Global Bollywood, the film grossed  in overseas markets outside India.  It became the second Bollywood film to break into the UK cinema top 10 after Dil Se.. which released the same year. It was a bigger box office success than Titanic when it was screened in Indonesia. Overseas, It is the highest-grossing Bollywood film of 1998.

Accolades 
Kuch Kuch Hota Hai received a leading 18 nominations at the 44th Filmfare Awards and won a leading 8 awards, including a sweep in all the major categories. It was the third film to win the four major awards (Best Film, Best Director, Best Actor and Best Actress) at Filmfare. Others include Guide (1965), Dilwale Dulhania Le Jayenge (1995) (also starring Shah Rukh Khan & Kajol), Devdas (2002), Black (2005) and Gully Boy (2019).

Home media 
The film was also released on VHS, DVD, and eventually Blu-ray. Now Kuch Kuch Hota Hai, along with Johar's second film Kabhi Khushi Kabhie Gham... (2001), often play on television to consistently high ratings. Johar said, "It's gratifying to know that they've aged well and passed the test of time."

Legacy
Kuch Kuch Hota Hai was the subject of reviews and critical analysis following its initial release. Subhash K Jha called the film "a simple stylish, sensuous and ambrosial love story," further adding that the chemistry between the lead pair was unbeatable. A reviewer for Timeout Film Guide, while commenting that the second love triangle went on too long, liked most of the film, saying that "its performances, camerawork, storytelling and extensive musical numbers [are] all energetically colourful." In 2004, Meor Shariman of The Malay Mail called the film a "must-watch" for Bollywood fans, and also for those seeking an introduction to Bollywood. The film has also been criticized for creating unreal worlds and characters, to which Johar has said that this was part of his vision of escapism.

One of the best examples of the iconic status of Kuch Kuch Hota Hai was the 2012 film Shirin Farhad Ki Toh Nikal Padi. Farah Khan and Boman Irani re-created scenes and characters from KKHH for posters to promote their film, and also paid homage in one of the songs, "Ramba Mein Samba". In 2010, Kuch Kuch Hota Hai was selected by Time as one of their "Five Essential Bollywood movies to Netflix". It was also mentioned in critic and author Shubhra Gupta's book, 50 Films That Changed Bollywood, 1995–2015. In 2018, Johar celebrated the 20-year anniversary of the film by hosting an event with the lead cast.

Koochie Koochie Hota Hai is an animated remake of the original, directed by Tarun Mansukhani. Shah Rukh Khan, Kajol, Rani Mukerji, Anupam Kher are reprising their roles as Rahul a.k.a. Rocky, Anjali a.k.a. Angie, Tina, and the Principal. New cast members include Uday Chopra, Riteish Deshmukh, Sanjay Dutt and Simi Garewal. The story will have an anthropomorphic animal cast. As of October 2012, Karan Johar has placed the project on permanent hold. He said, "Animation films are not working nowadays, so as of now I have kept it on stand-by."

See also
 List of highest-grossing Indian films in overseas markets

References

External links

 
 Kuch Kuch Hota Hai site at Dharma Productions
 Kuch Kuch Hota Hai site at Yash Raj Films
 
 
 Kuch Kuch Hota Hai at Bollywood Hungama

1990s romantic comedy-drama films
1998 films
Films directed by Karan Johar
Films scored by Jatin–Lalit
Films shot in Mauritius
Films shot in Ooty
1990s Hindi-language films
Films shot in Scotland
Indian coming-of-age comedy-drama films
Indian romantic comedy-drama films
Best Popular Film Providing Wholesome Entertainment National Film Award winners
Films distributed by Yash Raj Films
1998 directorial debut films
1998 comedy films
1998 drama films
1990s coming-of-age comedy-drama films